Leigh Dyer is a sculptor specialising in stainless steel metal.

His public commissions include:
 Lake sculpture near Hastings Museum and Art Gallery
 Peace Gardens in Alexandra Park, Hastings
 Clover Tree in the Old Town, Hastings
 "Run" sculptures at Denmark Hill, London
 A giant winkle at Winkle Island, Hastings

References

External links 
 https://web.archive.org/web/20120212143133/http://www.completelylondon.co.uk/tastings-hastings-arrives-in-shoreditch/

English sculptors
English male sculptors
Living people
Year of birth missing (living people)